The Mirabal sisters were four sisters from the Dominican Republic, three of whom (Patria, Minerva and María Teresa) opposed the dictatorship of Rafael Trujillo and were involved in clandestine activities against his regime. The three sisters were assassinated on 25 November 1960. The last sister, Adela "Dedé", who was not involved in political activities at the time, died of natural causes on 1 February 2014.

The assassinations turned the Mirabal sisters into "symbols of both popular and feminist resistance".  In 1999, in their honor, the United Nations General Assembly designated 25 November the International Day for the Elimination of Violence against Women.

The Mirabal Sisters

The Mirabal family were farmers from the central Cibao region of the Dominican Republic and had a farm in the village of Ojo de Agua, near the town of Salcedo. The sisters were considered part of the social elite and were raised by their parents, Enrique Mirabal Fernández and Mercedes Reyes Camilo. All four sisters attended primary school in their village, Ojo de Agua, and attended a Catholic boarding school, El Colegio de la Inmaculada, for their secondary education in the city of La Vega. Once Rafael Trujillo took power it was customary to have a picture of him in the household, however, the Mirabal house never had a picture of Trujillo and were subsequently considered people in disagreement with the Trujillo regime.

Patria Mercedes Mirabal Reyes
Patria Mercedes Mirabal Reyes (27 February 1924 – 25 November 1960), commonly known as Patria was the oldest of the four Mirabal sisters. When she was 14, she was sent by her parents to a Catholic boarding school, Colegio Inmaculada Concepción in La Vega. She left school when she was 17 and married Pedro González, a farmer, who would later aid her in challenging the Trujillo regime.

Patria had three children. She once said "We cannot allow our children to grow up in this corrupt and tyrannical regime. We have to fight against it, and I am willing to give up everything, even my life if necessary."

Bélgica Adela Mirabal Reyes 
Bélgica Adela Mirabal Reyes (1 March 1925 – 1 February 2014), commonly known as Dedé, was the second daughter of the Mirabal family. Unlike her sisters, she did not go to college but instead took the role of the traditional homemaker, and helped her father with the family business. The Mirabal patriarch, Enrique, died after his political imprisonment, and Dedé took over the family finances.  She did not become involved with her sisters' political work. After the murder of her sisters Dedé took care of their children. Between 1992 and 1994 Dedé started the Mirabal Sisters Foundation and the Mirabal Sisters museum to continue her sisters' legacy. Dedé was the last surviving sister of the family. She died at the age of 88, and professed her entire life that it was her destiny to survive so that she was able to "tell their story".

María Argentina Minerva Mirabal Reyes 

María Argentina Minerva Mirabal Reyes (12 March 1926 – 25 November 1960), commonly known as Minerva, was the third daughter. At the age of 12, she followed Patria to the Colegio Inmaculada Concepción.  In 1949, the Mirabal family was invited to a party for the local elite where Minerva first caught the eye of Rafael Trujillo, so much so that the Mirabals were invited to a different party by Trujillo himself. At this party Trujillo made more sexual advances toward Minerva who declined his offers. After Minerva's rejection of Trujillo, her parents prohibited Minerva from registering for law school due to concerns that she would get involved in politics and ultimately be killed. However, after seeing how upset Minerva was, her parents relented six years later and she enrolled at the University of Santo Domingo, where she later graduated summa cum laude. Minerva was the first woman to graduate law school in the Dominican Republic. Due to her previous rejection of Trujillo's advances, when Minerva graduated, her diploma was stripped of her honors and her license to practice law was ultimately turned down.

At university, she met her husband, Manolo Tavárez Justo, who would help her fight the Trujillo regime. Minerva was the most vocal and radical of the Mirabal daughters. According to the theologian Nancy Pineda-Madrid, she was arrested and harassed on multiple occasions on orders given by Trujillo himself. According to the historian Bernard Diederich, Minerva Mirabal was arrested twice ; she was first jailed in January 1960, at the start of the wave of repression of 1J4 members where "hundreds of 1J4 members are rounded up and tortured" She once said "It is a source of happiness to do whatever can be done for our country that suffers so many anguishes. It is sad to stay with one's arms crossed."

Antonia María Teresa Mirabal Reyes

Antonia María Teresa Mirabal Reyes (15 October 1935 – 25 November 1960), commonly known as María Teresa, was the fourth and youngest daughter. She attended the Colegio Inmaculada Concepción, graduated from the Liceo de San Francisco de Macorís in 1954, and went on to the University of Santo Domingo, where she studied mathematics. 

Later in her life, María Teresa dated Leandro Guzmán. While dating, before Leandro was allowed to hold María Teresa's hand, she asked him how his family felt about Trujillo. Leandro responded, "... there's no problem. At home, that was the first thing I learned... to hate Trujillo." After this response María Teresa let him hold her hand and they eventually married after she finished her education.  María Teresa was influenced by her older sister Minerva's political views and was involved in the clandestine activities against Trujillo's regime. As a result, she was harassed and arrested on the direct orders of Trujillo. She greatly admired her older sister Minerva and became passionate about Minerva's political views. She once said, "Perhaps what we have most near is death, but that idea does not frighten me. We shall continue to fight for that which is just."

Political activities
While attending the Colegio Inmaculada Concepción,  Minerva discovered that her friend Deisi Ariza's father was killed by Trujillo for opposing the regime. This event along with many others ultimately influenced Minerva's fight against the regime. Minerva became involved in the political movement against Trujillo, who was the country's official president from 1930 to 1938 and from 1942 to 1952, but ruled behind the scenes as a dictator from 1930 until his assassination in 1961. Minerva's sisters followed her into the movement: first María Teresa, who joined after staying at Minerva's house and learning about her activities, and then Patria, who joined after witnessing a massacre by some of Trujillo's men while on a religious retreat. Dedé did not join in, partly because her husband, Jaimito, did not want her to.

The husbands of Minerva, María Teresa, Patria were among the leaders of the 14th of June Movement, nicknamed 1J4. The movement was created in support, and then in honor, of the Dominican emigrants that invaded from Cuba and were tortured and killed 14 June 1959. Everyone in the family, including Patria's teenaged children, helped distribute pamphlets about the many people whom Trujillo had killed, and obtained materials for guns and bombs to use when they eventually openly revolted. Within the group, the sisters called themselves "Las Mariposas" ("The Butterflies"), after Minerva's underground name. The secret movement was discovered weeks after its founding leading to Patrias house (where the group met) being burned to the ground and María Teresa and Minerva's arrests.

In 1960, Minerva and María Teresa were incarcerated from January 22 to February 7, then from May 18 to August 9. They were not tortured thanks to mounting international opposition to Trujillo's regime. Patria was never arrested but her husband and son were jailed. The three husbands were incarcerated in January at La Victoria Penitentiary in Santo Domingo, then, in November, two of then were transferred to Puerto Plata.

In 1960, the Organization of American States condemned Trujillo's actions and sent observers. Minerva and María Teresa were freed, but their husbands remained in prison. On a remembrance website, Learn to Question, the author writes, "No matter how many times Trujillo jailed them, no matter how much of their property and possessions he seized, Minerva, Patria and María Teresa refused to give up on their mission to restore democracy and civil liberties to the island nation."

Assassination
On 25 November 1960, Patria, Minerva, María Teresa, and their driver, Rufino de la Cruz, were visiting María Teresa and Minerva's incarcerated husbands. Patria's husband was not incarcerated but she went along for moral support.  On the way home, they were stopped by Trujillo's henchmen. The sisters and de la Cruz were separated, strangled and clubbed to death. The bodies were then gathered and put in their Jeep, which was run off the mountain road in an attempt to make their deaths look like an accident.

After Trujillo was assassinated on 30 May 1961, General Pupo Román admitted to having personal knowledge that the sisters were killed by Victor Alicinio Peña Rivera, Trujillo's right-hand man, along with Ciriaco de la Rosa, Ramon Emilio Rojas, Alfonso Cruz Valeria, and Emilio Estrada Malleta, members of his secret police force. As to whether Trujillo ordered the killings or whether the secret police acted on its own, one historian wrote, "We know orders of this nature could not come from any authority lower than national sovereignty. That was none other than Trujillo himself; still less could it have taken place without his assent." Also, one of the murderers, Ciriaco de la Rosa, said "I tried to prevent the disaster, but I could not because if I had he, Trujillo, would have killed us all."

Aftermath

According to historian Bernard Diederich, the sisters' assassinations "had greater effect on Dominicans than most of Trujillo's other crimes". The killings, he wrote, "did something to their machismo" and paved the way for Trujillo's own assassination six months later.

However, the details of the Mirabal sisters' assassinations were "treated gingerly at the official level" until 1996, when President Joaquín Balaguer was forced to step down after more than two decades in power. Balaguer was Trujillo's protégé and had been the president at the time of the assassinations in 1960 (though, at the time, he "distanced himself from General Trujillo and initially carved out a more moderate political stance"). 

A review of the history curriculum in public schools in 1997 recognized the Mirabals as national martyrs. The post-Balaguer era has seen a marked increase in homages to the Mirabal sisters, including an exhibition of their belongings at the National Museum of History and Geography in Santo Domingo.

After the assassinations, the surviving sister, Dedé, devoted her life to the legacy of her sisters. She raised their six children, including Minou Tavárez Mirabal, Minerva's daughter, who has served as deputy for the National District in the lower house of the Dominican Congress since 2002 and was deputy foreign minister before that (1996–2000). Of Dedé's own three children, Jaime David Fernández Mirabal was the minister for environment and natural resources and a former vice president of the Dominican Republic. In 1992, Dedé created the Mirabal Sisters Foundation, and in 1994, she opened the Mirabal Sisters Museum in the sisters' hometown, Salcedo. She published a book, Vivas en su Jardín, on 25 August 2009. She lived in the house in Salcedo where the sisters were born until her death in 2014, aged 88.

Legacy

On 17 December 1999, the United Nations General Assembly designated 25 November as the International Day for the Elimination of Violence against Women in honor of the sisters. It marks the beginning of a 16-day period of Activism against Gender Violence. The last day of that period, 10 December, is International Human Rights Day.

On 21 November 2007, Salcedo Province was renamed Hermanas Mirabal Province.

Hermanas Mirabal station of the Santo Domingo Metro is named to honor the Mirabal sisters.

The 200 Dominican pesos bill features the sisters, and a stamp was issued in their memory.

The 137-foot obelisk that Trujillo built in 1935 to commemorate the renaming of the capital city from Santo Domingo to Ciudad Trujillo has been covered with murals honoring the sisters. In 1997, the telecommunications company CODETEL (now Claro) sponsored a mural by Elsa Núñez. Every few years, the mural changes. 

In 2005, Amaya Salazar created one; in 2011, Banco del Progreso sponsored Dustin Muñoz to redo the mural.

In 2019, the southeast corner of 168th street and Amsterdam Avenue in Washington Heights, Manhattan  was designated "Mirabal Sisters Way" by the Council of the City of New York. In addition there is a school campus in Washington Heights, Manhattan, Mirabal Sisters Campus.

In 2021, Rosa Hernández de Grullón, Ambassador of the Dominican Republic in France, inaugurated a plaque in Paris in honor of the famous Dominican resistance fighters murdered under the Trujillo dictatorship in 1960.

Being globally recognized as a symbol of social justice and feminism, the sisters have inspired the creation of many organizations that focus on keeping their legacy alive through social actions. An example of one of these organizations is the Mirabal Sisters Cultural and Community Center, a non-profit organization that seeks to improve the status of immigrant families.

In popular culture
 In 1994, Dominican-American author Julia Alvarez published her novel In the Time of the Butterflies, a fictionalized account of the lives of the Mirabal sisters. Alvarez called the sisters "feminist icons" and "a reminder that we have our revolutionary heroines, our Che Guevaras, too". The novel was adapted into a 2001 movie of the same name, starring Salma Hayek as Minerva, Edward James Olmos as Trujillo, and singer Marc Anthony in a supporting role.
 The sisters are mentioned in The Brief Wondrous Life of Oscar Wao, a 2007 novel by Dominican-American writer Junot Díaz.
 The story is fictionalized in the children's book How the Butterflies Grew Their Wings by Jacob Kushner.
 Chilean filmmaker Cecilia Domeyko produced Code Name: Butterflies, a documentary about the Mirabal sisters. It contains interviews with Dedé and other members of the Mirabal family.
 Actress Michelle Rodriguez co-produced the film Trópico de Sangre, which recounts the lives of the sisters. She also starred in the film as Minerva. Dedé Mirabal participated in the development of the film.
 Mario Vargas Llosa's 2000 novel, The Feast of the Goat, portrays the assassination of Trujillo and its effect on the lives of Dominicans. It refers often to the Mirabal sisters.
 Jon M. Chu's 2021 movie In The Heights, based on the musical of the same name, references the Mirabal sisters.

Geographic places
Several towns and cities in the Dominican Republic and abroad have named streets in memory of their struggle.

In the Dominican Republic:
 Esperanza
 Hato del Yaque
 Puerto Plata
 Salcedo
 Santiago de los Caballeros
 Santo Domingo
 Tamboril

In Spain:
 Alaquàs
 Albacete
 Burgos
 Mairena del Aljarafe

See also

 Women in the Dominican Republic
 Virgins of Galindo
 Villa sisters

References

External links
 
 Mirabal Sisters Cultural and Community Center

Assassinated activists
Assassinated Dominican Republic people
Dominican Republic activists
Dominican Republic women activists
Sibling quartets
Hermanas Mirabal Province
People murdered in the Dominican Republic
People killed in intelligence operations
Deaths by beating